Philip John Withers (born May 1963) FREng FRS is the Regius Professor of Materials in the School of Materials, University of Manchester. and Chief Scientist of the Henry Royce Institute.

Education
Withers was educated at the University of Cambridge where he was awarded an undergraduate degree in Natural Sciences (Physics) in 1985 followed by a PhD degree in the metallurgy of Metal Matrix Composites (MMCs) in 1988.

Career and research
Following his doctorate, Withers was appointed a lecturer at Cambridge before being appointed Professor at the University of Manchester in 1998.  His research investigates the application of advanced techniques to follow the behaviour of engineering and natural materials in real time and in 3D.

In 2008 Withers set up the Henry Moseley Manchester X-ray Imaging Facility (MXIF), which has extensive suites of 3D X-ray Imaging facilities. In 2012, Withers became the inaugural Director of the BP International Centre for Advanced Materials (ICAM) aimed understanding and developing materials across the energy industry. ICAM is a collaboration between BP, The University of Manchester, The University of Cambridge, Imperial College London and the University of Illinois at Urbana–Champaign.

With Bill Clyne, he is a co-author of the textbook An Introduction to Metal Matrix Composites. His research has been funded by the Engineering and Physical Sciences Research Council (EPSRC).

Awards and honours
Withers was elected a Fellow of the Royal Academy of Engineering (FREng) in 2005 and a Fellow of the Royal Society (FRS) in 2016. In 2014, the University of Manchester was awarded the Queen's Anniversary Prize, recognising Withers work at the Manchester X-ray Imaging Facility.

References

External links 

 

Living people
Fellows of the Royal Society
Foreign members of the Chinese Academy of Engineering
Academics of the University of Manchester
1963 births
Royal Society Wolfson Research Merit Award holders
Fellows of the Royal Academy of Engineering